Laura Närhi (born 19 January 1978) is a Finnish pop singer. The lead singer of Kemopetrol, she started a solo career and her debut solo album Suuri sydän was released in August 2010 and has sold over 30,000 copies in Finland. It peaked at number three on the Finnish Albums Chart.

Discography

Albums 
2010 Suuri sydän
2012 Tuhlari
2020 Vastavoimat

Singles 
2002: "Kuutamolla (Se ei mee pois)"
2010: "Jää mun luo"
2010: "Tämä on totta"
2010: "Mä annan sut pois" I'll let you go
2011: "Kaksi irrallaan" Two Untethered
2012: "Hetken tie on kevyt"
2012: "Tuhlari"
2012: "Siskoni" My Sister (featuring Erin)
2017: "Olet mulle se"

References

External links 

  

21st-century Finnish women singers
Finnish pop singers
People from Kirkkonummi
1978 births
Living people